Randleman Lake is a reservoir on the Deep River in Randolph and Guilford Counties in central North Carolina, extending from just northwest of Randleman to east of High Point.  The lake was created in 2004 with the construction of the Randleman Lake Dam.  The lake was created to satisfy the drinking water needs of the greater Greensboro area for the next 50 years, as well as to provide recreational opportunity.

History
The lake is in the Cape Fear River basin and was originally proposed by the US Army Corps of Engineers (USACE) in 1937.  Congress first authorized funds in 1968, $11 million.  By 1980, only preliminary studies had been done and the estimated cost was $135 million.  Later, in 1987, the US Army Corps of Engineers withdrew support for the project because the "cost of the Randleman Dam would outweigh the flood control benefits of building it".

Later that same year, the local Piedmont Triad Regional Water Authority (PTRWA) proposed a smaller reservoir, with a $57 million price tag, which used 40% less land.  Over the next several years, environmental impact statements were offered by the PTRWA, with the final Federal Environmental Impact Statement for the Randleman Lake Project being issued in 2000.  On April 6, 2001, the USACE issued a permit to allow construction, which began on August 7 of the same year.  On March 1, 2010 the lake officially opened to public recreation.

Drinking water
The lake's primary purpose is to provide drinking water for Greensboro, North Carolina. The City of Greensboro started receiving treated water from Piedmont Triad Regional Water Authority on October 4, 2010.

Recreation
Fishing and sailing is permitted in most areas of the lake. Because it is a government run facility for the purpose of providing drinking water, boats are not allowed overnight and other significant restrictions apply to fueling boats within the area. North of the Highway 62 bridge, no gasoline or liquid fueled motors are allowed at all.

References

External links
Official Heart of North Carolina Visitors Information Web Site
Piedmont Triad Regional Water Authourity Randleman Lake

Randleman
Protected areas of Randolph County, North Carolina
Protected areas of Guilford County, North Carolina
Bodies of water of Randolph County, North Carolina
Bodies of water of Guilford County, North Carolina
2004 establishments in North Carolina